Standings and results for Group 3 of the UEFA Euro 1984 qualifying tournament.

Group 3 consisted of Denmark, England, Greece, Hungary and Luxembourg. Group winners were Denmark, who finished a point clear of second-placed England.

Final table

Results

Goalscorers

References
UEFA Page
RSSSF

Group 3
1982–83 in English football
1982–83 in Hungarian football
1983–84 in Hungarian football
1982–83 in Greek football
1983–84 in Greek football
1982 in Danish football
1983 in Danish football
Denmark at UEFA Euro 1984
1982–83 in Luxembourgian football
1983–84 in Luxembourgian football
Qual